Night Life of New York is a 1925 American silent comedy film directed by Allan Dwan and written by Paul Schofield and Edgar Selwyn. The film stars Rod La Rocque, Ernest Torrence, Dorothy Gish, Helen Lee Worthing, George Hackathorne, and Arthur Housman. The film was released on August 3, 1925, by Paramount Pictures.

Plot
As described in a film magazine reviews, discouraged with his ne’er do well son, Ronald, John  Bentley consents to a plot to send him to New York City where it is planned to get him into as much trouble as possible so that he will soon want to leave the metropolis. Ronald gets mixed up in a jewel robbery, fights in a night club, is arrested, figures in the thrilling capture of a yeggman and, being found innocent, returns to Iowa with his telephone operator bride.

Cast

Preservation
With no prints of Night Life of New York located in any film archives, it is a lost film.

References

External links

Lobby card at www.gettyimages.com

1925 films
1920s English-language films
Silent American comedy films
1926 comedy films
1926 films
Paramount Pictures films
Films directed by Allan Dwan
American black-and-white films
American silent feature films
Lost American films
1925 comedy films
1920s lost films
Lost comedy films
1920s American films